Chen Chusheng  (born July 25, 1981) is a Chinese singer.

Early life
Chen was born in Sanya, Hainan. His family is originally from Puning, Guangdong. Since childhood, he has developed interests in the guitar and singing. He is also good at "boy's activities" for instance Kungfu, soccer, fishing. During high school, he played and sang in the nearby pub on weekends. In 2000, aged 19, Chen went to Shenzhen to explore opportunities. Starting off with working in a restaurant run by his relatives, he soon concentrated on developing a singing career – meeting musicians in the same camp and performing for clubs in town.

Career
With his singing skills developed, Chen took chances to participate in some music programmes and competitions, and was highly acclaimed by the audiences. In 2001, Chen won the Most Potential award at the MTV Asia Awards, held in Shanghai. In 2003, he was awarded the champion title of the National Pub Singer Competition, held in Changsha, Hunan, and signed with EMI. In 2007, he was crowned "Super Boy" champion, and signed with E.E. Media. It was confirmed in January 2009, however, Chen broke up with the management firm, which he accused of inappropriate publicisation of his private life for the purpose of raising his profile.

Has Anyone Told You
E.E. Media released an album in July 2007, 13, for the top 13 contestants of "Super Boy" of the year, containing Chen's debut single Has Anyone Told You《有没有人告诉你》.

I'm actually not alone along the way
In November 2007, his first own EP of I'm actually not alone along the way《原来我一直都不孤单》 was released, containing three originals I'm actually not alone along the way, Has Anyone Told You《有没有人告诉你》 and Search《寻找》, in addition to a new song La La La《啦啦啦》 and a cover Sing by British band "Travis".

Discography

Albums and EPs (extended plays)

Filmography
 Oh My God (2015)
 Forever Young (2018)

Philanthropy
For a short film promoting charitable activities in Guizhou, produced by SZTV in 2002, Chen sang the theme song Kids in the Mountains《大山的孩子》.

References

External links
 Chen's official blog

1981 births
Living people
Chaoshanese people
People from Sanya
Singers from Hainan
Super Boy contestants